Arthur Edward Liddicut (17 October 1891 – 8 April 1983) was an Australian cricketer. He played first-class cricket for Victoria between 1912 and 1933.

A lower-middle-order batsman and fast-medium bowler, Liddicut toured New Zealand with an Australian team in 1920-21, playing both of the matches against New Zealand, but did not play Test cricket. His highest first-class score was 152 for Victoria against South Australia in 1920-21, batting at number nine. His best bowling figures were 7 for 40 against Tasmania in 1929-30 when, captaining Victoria, he opened the bowling and bowled throughout the innings, dismissing Tasmania for 77. Against the touring MCC team in 1922-23 he took 4 for 16 from 15 eight-ball overs then scored 102 in 138 minutes.

He played in District Cricket for the Fitzroy first team until his fifties, and served as the club's delegate to the Victorian Cricket Association from 1931 to 1970.

See also
 List of Victoria first-class cricketers

References

External links
 

1891 births
1983 deaths
Australian cricketers
Victoria cricketers
Cricketers from Melbourne
Australian cricket administrators